Dame Eva Anstruther  (25 January 186919 June 1935) was an English writer and poet.

Early life 
She was born as Eva Isabella Henrietta Hanbury-Tracy, the eldest child of the 4th Lord Sudeley.

Career 
Anstruther wrote poems, newspaper columns, short stories, plays and several novels. During the First World War, she was director of operations of the Camps Library, whose director was Sir Edward Ward.  The Camps Library was a charitable organisation responsible for stocking libraries for troops and prisoners of war in France. Anstruther was able to use her contacts in the publishing industry to obtain remaindered books for the libraries. For this service she was made a Dame Commander of the Order of the British Empire in 1918.

Personal life
She married M.P. Henry Torrens Anstruther in 1889 (they divorced in 1915). The couple had two children, Douglas and Joyce, who became a writer.

Death
She died at her home in Chelsea from bronchial pneumonia on 19 June 1935, aged 66.

Selected works 

 The Influence of Mars (1900) short stories
Old Clothes (1904) play
A Lady in Waiting (1905) fiction
Fido (1907) play
The Whirligig (1908) play
 My Lonely Soldier (1916) play
The Vanished Kitchen-Maid (6 March 1920) article in The Graphic

References

External links 

 Play My Lonely Soldier at Great War Theatre website
Dame Eva Isabella Henrietta Anstruther in 1930 at National Portrait Gallery

English short story writers
English columnists
Dames Commander of the Order of the British Empire
People from the Borough of Tewkesbury
1869 births
1935 deaths
English women poets
British women short story writers
Place of birth missing
British women columnists
English women non-fiction writers
English women dramatists and playwrights